The Good Girls is a 2018 Mexican drama film directed by Alejandra Márquez Abella.

Cast
Ilse Salas - Sofía
Flavio Medina - Fernando
Cassandra Ciangherotti - Alejandra
Paulina Gaitán - Ana Paula

References

External links 
 
 

Mexican drama films
2018 drama films
2010s Mexican films